Club Deportivo Universidad Católica is a football club that plays in Chilean Primera División. The club played its first competitive match on 30 May 1937 in Chilean Serie B. Universidad Católica has won 16 Primera División titles, 2 Segunda División titles, 4 Copa Chile, 4 Supercopa de Chile, 1 Copa Apertura, 1 Copa República and 1 Copa Interamericana (1994), achieving a total of 29 titles to date.

Key 

Key to league:
 P = Played
 W = Games won
 D = Games drawn
 L = Games lost
 GF = Goals for
 GA = Goals against
 Pts = Points
 Pos = Final position

Key to divisions and rounds:
C = Champions
DSQ = Disqualified
RU = Runners-up
SF = Semi-finals
QF = Quarter-finals
R16 = Round of 16
R32 = Round of 32
R3 = Third Round
R2 = Second Round
R1 = First Round
GS = Group stage

Key to tournaments:
CC = Copa Chile
SC = Supercopa de Chile
CA = Campeonato de Apertura
TCC = Torneo de Consuelo Apertura
CR = Copa República
CI = Copa de Invierno
CL = Copa Libertadores
CS = Copa Sudamericana
CI = Copa Interamericana
CM = Copa Mercosur

Seasons

See also 
 Universidad Católica records and statistics
 Universidad Católica in international football

Notes

References